The Hunley-class was a class of two submarine tenders in service with the United States Navy from 1962 to 1996.

History
The Hunley-class was the first class of submarine tenders in the U.S. Navy being built from the keel up to service ballistic missile submarines (SSBN). The early generations of SSBNs were equipped with the UGM-27 Polaris missile. To handle these missiles, a large 32 ton crane was installed aft that moved in a large circle. In 1973-1975 both ships were converted to handle the newer UGM-73 Poseidon missile. The massive crane was then replaced by two smaller ones. The ships were powered by ten Diesel engines, delivering 15.000 SHP on one shaft.  Both tenders were decommissioned following the retirement of the Poseidon-equipped SSBNs. After spending at least a decade in the Reserve Fleet, both ships were scrapped.

Ships

References

 

Hunley-class submarine tenders
Cold War auxiliary ships of the United States
Auxiliary depot ship classes